Tempa is a garage and dubstep music label founded in 2000 by Neil Jolliffe, who also coined the term "dubstep" in 2002.

The label, along with Big Apple, and parent label Ammunition, was part of the formation of dubstep as a genre.

A key member and the face of Tempa Recordings is DJ and producer Youngsta, who has been in charge of artists and repertoire for the label since its inception.

The label's biggest release is the "Midnight Request Line" by Skream which was released in 2005.

Artists

 Alex Coulton
 Amit
 Appleblim
 Artwork
 AxH
 Benga
 Benny Ill
 Biome
 Cimm
 Cliques
 Coki (Digital Mystikz)
 Cosmin TRG
 D1
 Data
 DJ Distance
 Dub War
 El-B
 Facta
 Goldspot Productions
 Hatcha
 Headhunter
 High Plains Drifter
 Hodge
 Horsepower Productions
 Ipman
 J Da Flex
 J:Kenzo
 Killawatt
 Kode9
 LX One
 Magnetic Man
 Markee Ledge
 Nomine
 Osiris Jay
 Parris
 Proxima
 Quest
 SP:MC
 Sam Frank
 Seven
 Silkie
 Skeptical
 Skream
 Soap Dodgers
 TRG
 The Culprit
 The Spaceape
 Truth
 Wen
 Youngsta

References

External links
 Official website

Record labels based in London
Electronic music record labels
Record labels established in 2000
Dubstep record labels
UK garage record labels